Jerry Greenberg may refer to:

Jerry L. Greenberg, music executive
Gerald B. Greenberg (1936–2017), film editor, usually credited as Jerry Greenberg